Blanfordiceras is a strongly ribbed, evolute ammonite included in the perisphinctacean family, Neocomitidae that lived during the latest Jurassic.
The shell of Blanfordiceras is discoidal, with evolute coiling and all whorls visible so as to have a broad umbilicus.  Exposed whorls are ornamented with strong ribbing that arises from the umbilicus, bifurcating on the outer flanks and extending onto the venter.  In general form Blanfordiceras is similar to Berriasella, although with a more rounded whorl section.

References
Notes

Bibliography

Cretaceous ammonites
Ammonitida
Fossils of Antarctica
Tithonian life